George II (died 1585), of the Bagrationi Dynasty, was a king of Imereti from 1565 to 1585.

Reign
George II  succeeded on the death of his father, Bagrat III. With his ascend to the throne, George found himself involved in the civil war among the princes of western Georgia. He sided with his nominal vassal, Giorgi II Gurieli, Prince of Guria, against Levan I Dadiani, Prince of Mingrelia. The latter allied himself with the king's cousin Prince Khosro, Varaz Chiladze and other Imeretian nobles, and attempted, in 1568, to oust George II in favor of Khosro. The king won a victory at Ianeti and, together with the prince of Guria, took control of Mingrelia. Levan fled to Istanbul and, with an Ottoman support, resumed the throne, forcing Gurieli to plea for peace. Later, the two princes forged an alliance and revolted against the king. 

The western Georgian princes became engulfed into the havoc of feudal warfare, mounting and disbanding alliances, and raiding the rival fiefdoms. In addition to the civil strife, the Ottomans also increased their pressure upon the Kingdom of Imereti. Although George II was able to block the advance of the Turkish commander Lala Mustafa Pasha from eastern Georgia in 1578, he had to submit to the sultan’s order and, in 1581, at the head of a combined Imeretian-Mingrelian-Gurian army, raided the eastern Georgian kingdom of Kartli whose ruler, Simon I, waged a relentless guerrilla warfare against the Ottoman army.

Family
George II was married three times. The identity of his first wife is unknown; she may have been an anonymous daughter of Mamia I Gurieli. He married secondly to Rusudan Shervashidze (died 1578) and thirdly to Tamar (died 1586), daughter of Prince Shermazan Diasamidze. He had six sons:
 Prince Alexander (died 1558), born of George's first marriage.
 Bagrat (1565 – 22 May 1578), born of George's second marriage.
 Levan (1573–1590), born of George's second marriage, King of Imereti (1585–1588).
 Prince Alexander (fl. 1584), born of George's third marriage.  
 Prince Mamia (fl. 1584), born of George's third marriage.
 Prince Rostom (fl. 1584), born of George's third marriage.

References

 Вахушти Багратиони (Vakhushti Bagrationi) (1745). История Царства Грузинского: Жизнь Имерети.

1585 deaths
Bagrationi dynasty of the Kingdom of Imereti
Kings of Imereti
16th-century people from Georgia (country)
16th-century births
Eastern Orthodox monarchs